Holiday in Your Heart is a 1997 drama, based on a story written by LeAnn Rimes and Tom Carter. This made-for-television movie co-stars Bernadette Peters as a country singer. The movie aired on ABC television on December 14, 1997.

Plot
The story is told as part realistic, part fable. A young country singer, LeAnn Rimes, playing herself, prepares to make her debut at the Grand Ole Opry at Christmas. However, her beloved grandmother is hospitalized and LeAnn is faced with a difficult decision. While trying to reconcile her new-found stardom with her family obligations she meets Faith Shawn (Bernadette Peters), a once-famous country singer. Faith decides to mentor LeAnn, showing her the history of country music. 

Faith relates a poignant family story to LeAnn. In a flash-back, Faith and her band are seen stuck on a bus in a snow-storm. Faith, a diabetic, is given insulin by a stranger, who dies overnight. He is later revealed to be her father, who she had not spoken to in many years. Faith and her husband Carl erect a monument to that fateful event. Faith's subtle message is about the importance of family.

As she is finally about to sing at the Grand Ole Opry, LeAnn tells her parents about meeting Faith, and she discovers that Faith and Carl died in an accident after getting struck by Lightning.

Faith and LeAnn sing a duet, "Crazy", and Rimes also sings "One Way Ticket", and "Blue."  "On the Side of Angels" is sung by Peters and others during the snow-storm. "Holiday in Your Heart" aired on My Life Time on December 22, 2010.

Cast
LeAnn Rimes as herself
Bernadette Peters as Faith Shawn
Rebecca Schull as Grandma Teeden
Vernon Grote as Avery
Carol Farabee as Audrey
Harlan Jordan as Grandpa Luther
Charles Homet as Guitar Player
Rance Howard as Blind Man
Cherami Leigh as Young LeAnn Rimes
Elizabeth Perry as Screaming Fan
Mark Walters as Carl
Rodger Boyce as Burly Man
Megan Cole as Young Faith
John William Galt as Santa
Gil Glasgow as Bus Driver
Alana Grace as Young Child
Tommy G. Kendrick as Jason
Curtis Randall	as Larry
Kellie Rasberry as Tutor

Production
Rimes and Tom Carter wrote the part autobiographical, part fictional book Holiday in Your Heart after being approached by Doubleday. ABC then asked her to do a movie based on the book. Bernadette Peters was cast because, Rimes said, she is "a wonderful actress", not for crossover appeal.

The movie was filmed in Dallas, Texas.

Music
 One Way Ticket (Because I Can) by LeAnn Rimes (Keith Hinton, Judy Rodman)
 Blue by LeAnn Rimes (Bill Mack)
 Crazy by LeAnn Rimes (Willie Nelson)
 On The Side Of Angels by Bernadette Peters (Faith Shawn) (Gary Burr, Gerry House)
 Amazing Grace by LeAnn Rimes (John Newton)
 Broken Wing by LeAnn Rimes (Phil Barnhart, Sam Hogin, James House)
 On The Side Of Angels by LeAnn Rimes (Gary Burr, Gerry House)
 Put A Little Holiday In Your Heart by LeAnn Rimes (Greg Wojohn, Roger Wojohn, Scott Wojohn)

Response
The Houston Chronicle reviewer wrote that this is "the ideal TV movie to launch this 15-year-old's acting career. It's her own story. And, in a stroke of sugarplum casting, Bernadette Peters is there to help her tell it. Peters sings with her, too, and they're sensational."

Awards and nominations
Motion Picture Sound Editors
Best Sound Editing - Television Movies of the Week - Music--Susan Mick (WON)

See also
 List of Christmas films

References

External links
 Holiday in Your Heart at Internet Movie Database
 Holiday in Your Heart at My Life Time

1997 television films
1997 films
American television films
American Christmas films
Films scored by Michael Tavera
1990s English-language films
1990s Christmas films
Films directed by Michael Switzer